Hadena caesia, also called the grey, is a species of moth of the family Noctuidae. It has a scattered distribution all over Europe (see subspecies section).

Technical description and variation

Forewing blue grey, with a furry look, caused by dusky grey irroration; both folds tinged with fulvous; lines and markings often indistinct; upper stigmata pale, with yellow scales in their annuli; a dark antemedian band widened to inner margin and a less prominent dark submarginal cloud; a small dark blotch at middle of costa; hindwing dark fuscous, paler towards base; — manani Gregs. from the Isle of Man and the Irish coast, is uniformly darker slate colour; — ab. nigrescens Stgr., from the Pyrenees, Alps, and Mts. of Scandinavia is much darker, the forewing suffused with black; on the other hand [now full species Hadena clara] Stgr., from Armenia and Asia Minor, has the forewing greyer, with a pinkish tinge; the median area paler.

Biology
Adults are on wing from June to August.

Larva brownish ochreous, freckled with darker; a dorsal series of V-shaped marks; subdorsal line darker. The young larvae feed on capsules of various Silene species (including Silene nutans and Silene vulgaris). Later, they feed on the leaves. They overwinter as a pupa.

Subspecies
 ssp. caesia (Denis&Schiffermüller, 1775) (Alps)
 ssp. abruzzensis (Draudt, 1934) (Apennine Mountains)
 ssp. ostrogovichi (Hacker, 1989) (Carpathian Mountains)
 ssp. bulgarica (Boursin, 1959) (Bulgaria)
 ssp. xanthophoba (Schawerda, 1922) (Balkan Peninsula)
 ssp. mananii (Gregson, 1866) (Great Britain and Ireland)
 ssp. frigida (Zetterstedt, 1839) (southern Fennoscandia)
 ssp. grisea (Hospital, 1948) (mountains of northern Spain)
 ssp. revolcadorensis (Calle, 1983) (the Region of Murcia)
 ssp. castiliana (Reisser, 1935) (Castile region)

References

External links
Lepiforum e.V.
schmetterlinge-deutschlands.de 
UKmoths
Funet Taxonomy
Fauna Europaea

Hadena
Moths of Europe
Moths described in 1775